Gol Bezan  is an Iranian football podcast in English and Persian created in 2014. Gol Bezan offers match analysis on the Iran national football team and interviews which have been regularly quoted by notable Iranian sports outlets.

References 

Sports podcasts
Audio podcasts
2014 podcast debuts